The women's 100 metres hurdles at the 2008 Summer Olympics took place on 17–19 August at the Beijing National Stadium.

The qualifying standards were 12.96 s (A standard) and 13.11 s (B standard).

Coming into the Olympics, Lolo Jones had the fastest time of the year, 12.45 in the semi-finals of the U.S. Olympic Trials.  Jones had also won those trials convincingly in a wind aided 12.29 (coming within .08 of the 20-year-old world record).

The first round was distinguished by five runners finishing within .03 of each other.  In the semi-final, Jones separated from the field by .19, setting a wind legal personal best 12.43 and a new fastest time of the year.

In the final, Sally McLellan was out fast, clearly the first over the first hurdle.  By the fourth hurdle she had almost a full stride lead over the wall of competitors across the track behind her, with Jones starting to gain a slight advantage.  But McLellan couldn't hold the lead.  Over the next two hurdles, Jones stormed by, with the rest of the field gaining on McLellan.  Dawn Harper was starting to separate ahead of the wall.  Jones continued to pull away to a full stride on Harper as McLellan fell back to run even with the wall.  At the ninth hurdle, Jones didn't get her lead leg high enough to clear the barrier.  Her foot hit the slat square on.  She rode the hurdle to the ground, landing awkwardly and losing her forward momentum.  She had to jump long strides just to clear the final hurdle but was losing ground on every step.  Harper took the hurdles cleanly and held her edge to cross the line for gold.  Behind her, McLellan, Priscilla Lopes-Schliep, Damu Cherry, Delloreen Ennis-London and Brigitte Foster-Hylton (the wall) hit the line together.  .02 separated second through sixth with McLellan getting the photo finish nod over Lopes-Schliep for the medals.  Four years later Harper and McLellan (under her married name of Pearson) would also get gold and silver, but in the opposite order.

Records
Prior to this competition, the existing world and Olympic records were as follows:

No new world or Olympic records were set for this event.

Results

Round 1
Qualifying rule: first two of each heat (Q) plus the six fastest times (q) qualified.

Semifinals
Qualification: First 4 in each heat and the next fastest advance to the Final.

Final

References

Athletics at the 2008 Summer Olympics
Sprint hurdles at the Olympics
2008 in women's athletics
Women's events at the 2008 Summer Olympics